Doron Zeilberger (דורון ציילברגר, born 2 July 1950 in Haifa, Israel) is an Israeli mathematician, known for his work in combinatorics.

Education and career
He received his doctorate from the Weizmann Institute of Science in 1976, under the direction of Harry Dym, with the thesis "New Approaches and Results in the Theory of Discrete Analytic Functions." He is a Board of Governors Professor of Mathematics at Rutgers University.

Contributions
Zeilberger has made contributions to combinatorics, hypergeometric identities, and q-series.  Zeilberger gave the first proof of the alternating sign matrix conjecture, noteworthy not only for its mathematical content, but also for the fact that Zeilberger recruited nearly a hundred volunteer checkers to "pre-referee" the paper. In 2011, together with Manuel Kauers and Christoph Koutschan, Zeilberger proved the q-TSPP conjecture, which was independently stated in 1983 by George Andrews and David P. Robbins.

Zeilberger is an ultrafinitist. He is also known for crediting his computer "Shalosh B. Ekhad" as a co-author ("Shalosh" and "Ekhad" mean "Three" and "One" in Hebrew respectively, referring to his first computer, an AT&T 3B1), and for his provocative opinions.

Awards and honors
Zeilberger received a Lester R. Ford Award in 1990. Together with Herbert Wilf, Zeilberger was awarded the American Mathematical Society's Leroy P. Steele Prize for Seminal Contributions to Research in 1998 for their development of WZ theory, which has revolutionized the field of hypergeometric summation. In 2004, Zeilberger was awarded the Euler Medal; the citation refers to him as "a champion of using computers and algorithms to do mathematics quickly and efficiently". In 2016 he received, together with Manuel Kauers and Christoph Koutschan, the David P. Robbins Prize of the American Mathematical Society.

Zeilberger was a member of the inaugural 2013 class of fellows of the American Mathematical Society.

See also 
 MacMahon Master theorem
 Wilf–Zeilberger pair

References

External links

 Doron Zeilberger's homepage
 Biography from ScienceWorld
 
 
 
 
 
 From A = B to Z = 60, a conference in honor of Doron Zeilberger's 60th birthday, 27 and 28 May 2010

1950 births
Living people
20th-century Israeli  mathematicians
21st-century Israeli  mathematicians
Combinatorialists
Fellows of the American Mathematical Society
Israeli Jews
Jewish scientists
People from Haifa
Rutgers University faculty
Weizmann Institute of Science alumni